The Journal of Biogeography is a peer-reviewed scientific journal in biogeography that was established in 1974. It covers aspects of spatial, ecological, and historical biogeography. The founding editor-in-chief was David Watts, followed by John Flenley, Philip Stott (1987-2004), Robert J. Whittaker (2004-2015), and Peter Linder (University of Zurich; 2015-2019). The current editor-in-chief is Michael N Dawson (University of California, Merced).

Abstracting and indexing 
The journal is abstracted and indexed in:

According to the Journal Citation Reports, the journal has a 2021 impact factor of 4.810.

References

External links 
 

Ecology journals
English-language journals
Geography journals
Monthly journals
Wiley-Blackwell academic journals
Publications established in 1974